The 1988 Torneo Godó was a men's professional tennis tournament that was played on outdoor clay courts at the Real Club de Tenis Barcelona in Barcelona, Catalonia, Spain that was part of the 1988 Grand Prix circuit. It was the 36th edition of the tournament and took place from 12 September to 18 September 1988. Second-seeded Kent Carlsson won his second singles title at the event after 1986.

Finals

Singles
 Kent Carlsson defeated  Thomas Muster 6–3, 6–3, 3–6, 6–1
 It was Carlsson's 5th singles title of the year and the 9th and last of his career.

Doubles
 Sergio Casal /  Emilio Sánchez defeated  Claudio Mezzadri /  Diego Pérez 2–6, 6–4, 9–7

References

External links
 Official tournament website
 ITF tournament edition details
 ATP tournament profile

Barcelona Open (tennis)
Torneo Godo
Torneo Godó
Torneo Godó